Zelda Wii may refer to three different video games in The Legend of Zelda series for the Wii console:
The Legend of Zelda: Twilight Princess, released in 2006
The Legend of Zelda: Skyward Sword, released in 2011
Link's Crossbow Training, a spinoff game in The Legend of Zelda series, released in 2007

These three particular games are the more modern works, though some others may now be in print